Miss Fame (born March 30, 1985) is the stage name of Kurtis Frank Dam-Mikkelsen, an American model, makeup artist, drag queen, recording artist and reality television personality best known as a contestant on season 7 of RuPaul's Drag Race. After appearing on the show, Dam-Mikkelsen as Miss Fame launched a music career, releasing his debut single, "Rubber Doll" on April 28, 2015. His debut album, Beauty Marked, was released on June 9, 2015. Miss Fame appeared in numerous fashion publications.

Career
Dam-Mikkelsen worked as a male editorial model in California before moving to New York in 2011, following the advice of fashion photographer Mike Ruiz. He then started working as a makeup artist under industry icon Pat McGrath while building a celebrity clientele. At the same time he started modeling and performing in drag as "Miss Fame."

Miss Fame was noticed by photographer Mary McCartney who featured her in her book Devoted. She has also appeared in Half-Drag, a photo series by Leland Bobbé which attracted international attention and was featured in Vogue Italia. Miss Fame was also photographed for Gorgeous, a project by photographers Rob Lebow and Masha Kupets that involved Armen Ra, Candis Cayne, and Tammie Brown. Dam-Mikkelsen works as a celebrity makeup artist in New York City, and has worked on models and celebrities including Ève Salvail, Snooki and JWoww, Martha Wash, Wendy Williams, and Michael Urie.

On December 7, 2014, during the "Ru-Veal" of the seventh season of RuPaul's Drag Race, Miss Fame was the first queen announced to be a contestant on the show. She was eliminated in the ninth episode, "Divine Inspiration," placing her seventh overall. Following her elimination, she released the music video for "Rubber Doll", which was the first single from her debut album, Beauty Marked. The album was released June 9, 2015, and featured appearances from fellow Drag Race contestants Alaska Thunderfuck and Violet Chachki.

In 2016, Miss Fame signed with IMG models Paris. 

Miss Fame has been celebrated for her high-fashion editorial work and collaborations with world-renowned photographers like Steven Klein, Giampaolo Sgura, Armin Morbach, Ali Mahdavi, and others. Miss Fame has been featured in publications including Vogue Germany, Vogue Portugal, Vogue Paris, Vogue Japan, CR Fashion Book, PAPER, V Magazine, LOVE, CANDY, Tush, OUT, ELLE, and others.

She contributed to the compilation album Christmas Queens 3 in 2017.

In September 2018, Miss Fame performed as a background dancer behind Christina Aguilera for Opening Ceremony's Spring 2019 collection, with other Drag Race alumni. She released her own makeup line called "The Fetish of Fashion" later in October.

Early and personal life
Dam-Mikkelsen was born to Dolly Silveira in San Luis Obispo, California. He has also stated that he was raised by his grandmother, Gloria, as her own son. Kurtis lives with his husband Patrick Berschy and their pet dachshunds, Mina and Shaya.

In 2020, Kurtis moved to Zürich, Switzerland with his husband.

Discography

Albums

Singles

Other appearances

Filmography

Film

Television

Web series

Music videos

Music video appearances

Awards and nominations

See also 
 LGBT culture in New York City
 List of LGBT people from New York City

References

External links

 
 Official website for Kurtis Dam-Mikkelsen
 

21st-century American singers
American make-up artists
American drag queens
American LGBT singers
LGBT people from California
LGBT people from New York (state)
LGBT YouTubers
People from San Luis Obispo, California
RuPaul's Drag Race contestants
Television personalities from California
American YouTubers
Living people
1985 births
American cosmetics businesspeople
20th-century LGBT people
21st-century LGBT people
Genderfluid people